The Gotha Go P.60 was a jet-powered flying wing fighter proposed during World War II by Gothaer Waggonfabrik (Gotha). It was conceived as an improved derivative of the single-seat Horten Ho 229, which Gotha had begun to manufacture as the Go 229. The initial concept a two-seat multi-role fighter that was subsequently developed into a three-seat night and all-weather fighter, but no variant was ever built.

Design and development 
The company proposed the Go P.60A in January 1945, retaining many of the same principles of construction as the Horten design, but mounted the engines in external nacelles and totally revised the cockpit layout. The Go P.60A was to have two BMW 003A-1 turbojet engines, mounted above and below the wing. This arrangement was chosen for ease of maintenance as well as to simplify the process of installing other engines, although it severely compromised the ability of the pilots to bail out of the fighter. Fully faired into the leading edge of the fuselage, the pressurized cockpit would have been occupied by the pilot and an observer in side-by-side prone positions. The center section of the plywood-skinned fuselage would be built from steel tubing with wings made from wood and was equipped with tricycle landing gear. Yaw control would have been provided by a pair of retractable drag rudders near the tip of each wing. Fuel would be carried in a center tank and in the wings. The trailing edges of the wings were fitted with elevons. Three armament configurations were proposed, a high-altitude fighter (Höhenjäger) with four  MK 108 cannon, a heavy fighter (Zerstörer) with two 30 mm MK 103 cannons, and a reconnaissance fighter (Aufklärer) with two MK 108 cannon and two cameras.

The RLM rejected Gotha's proposal, and instead ordered more Go 229s. However, work on a simplified version as the Go P.60B continued. This version differed from the Go P.60A in that the two crew sat upright in a conventional cockpit. The drag rudders of the original design were replaced with more conventional units, and the nose gear leg was relocated to the centerline.  Power was to be provided by two Heinkel HeS 011 engines, and armament was to consist of four MK 108 cannon. Construction of the prototype was halted midway in favor of the Go P.60C.

The Go P.60C was proposed as a night fighter variant. A radar was to be fitted in a lengthened nose, and three upward-firing MK 108 cannons would have complemented the four cannons of the previous model. Power was to be provided by a pair of either BMW 003 or HeS 011 engines, complemented by a single Walter HWK solid-fueled booster rocket.  Work on the Go P.60 was halted by the end of the war in Europe.

Variants 
Go P.60A, initial version featuring a prone cockpit and two BMW 003A-1 engines mounted vertically.  None built.
Go P.60A Höhenjäger, proposed high altitude fighter version.
Go P.60A Zerstörer, proposed heavy fighter version.
Go P.60A Aufklärer, proposed reconnaissance fighter version.
Go P.60A/R, proposed version of the Höhenjäger to be fitted with a single Walter HWK 508B rocket engine between the engines.

Go P.60B, simplified version featuring a conventional cockpit and rudders.  Prototype halted midway through construction.

Go P.60C, night fighter version with a radar in the nose.  None built.

Go P-60.007, variant with a layout similar to the A but with the engines recessed beneath the fuselage and noticeable dihedral. Known only from a drawing, it may be the "fourth" variant mentioned in a March 1945 report by Gôthert.

Specifications (Go P.60A, as designed)

See also

References

Bibliography

Flying wings
Gotha aircraft